A bail handle, or simply bail, is a handle that consists of an open loop that moves freely within two fixed mounts or ears. Several designs are available: bails are typically made of metal (wire) or plastic. It is a type of package handle which may be used for carrying an item, such as a tin can or bucket; or kettle, or as a drawer pull. A bail handle can also be used to hang an item such as a pharmaceutical bottle potted plants, etc.

A flip-top closure on a bottle or jar is sometimes called a bail closure.

Decorative bail handles appeared on pieces of French Rococo furniture during the early 18th century. These handles on drawers were rounded and hinged onto an escutcheon plate and hung down in the shape of a half moon or arch. Due to being hinged, they were able to move up and down and they were usually elaborately decorated.

Examples

References

Books
 Yam, K.L., "Encyclopedia of Packaging Technology", John Wiley & Sons, 2009, 
 Soroka, W, "Fundamentals of Packaging Technology", IoPP, 2002, 

Cabinets (furniture)
History of furniture
Furniture
Rococo art
Packaging